42 Cancri is a single star in the northern zodiac constellation of Cancer. With an apparent visual magnitude of 6.83, it is dimmer than what is considered the normal lower limit for visibility with the naked eye. The star is located at a distance of approximately 616 light years from the Sun based on parallax, and is drifting further away with a radial velocity of +35 km/s. 42 Cancri is a member of the Beehive Cluster (NGC 2632).

The stellar classification of this star is A7III, matching an A-type star that is in the giant stage. However, this may be a misclassification of a main sequence star. It has also been classified as a spectroscopic binary, although no orbital elements are published. 42 Cancri is an estimated 603 million years old and is spinning rapidly with a projected rotational velocity of 195 km/s. The star has 2.39 times the mass of the Sun and 4.2 times the Sun's radius. It is radiating 51.5 times the luminosity of the Sun from its photosphere at an effective temperature of 7,607 K.

References

A-type giants
Cancer (constellation)
Durchmusterung objects
Cancri, 42
073785
042578